The 2022 Lewis Flyers men's volleyball team represented Lewis University in the 2022 NCAA Division I & II men's volleyball season. The Flyers, led by eighteenth year head coach Dan Friend, played their home games at Neil Carey Arena. The Flyers were members of the Midwestern Intercollegiate Volleyball Association and were picked to finish second the MIVA in the preseason poll behind Loyola Chicago. The Flyers ended the season fourth in the MIVA, holding a 2–0 record against Ohio State as the tiebreaker, and lost in the MIVA Semifinals.

Season highlights
Will be filled in as the season progresses.

Roster

Schedule
TV/Internet Streaming information:
All home games will be televised on GLVC SN. All road games will also be streamed on the oppositions streaming service. 

 *-Indicates conference match.
 Times listed are Central Time Zone.

Announcers for televised games
Maryville: Patrick Hennessey & Tyler Avenatti
NJIT: Patrick Hennessey & Tyler Avenatti 
St. Francis: Cody Lindeman, & Tyler Avenatti
Long Beach State: Patrick Hennessey
Belmont Abbey: Cody Lindeman & Logan Kap
Pepperdine: Al Epstein
UCLA: Denny Cline
Grand Canyon: Cody Lindeman, Bella Ray, & Andrea Zeiser
Ball State: Cody Lindeman, Juliana Van Loo, & Ally Hickey
Ohio State: Patrick Hennessey, Juliana Van Loo, & Ally Hickey
Lindenwood: Michael Wagenknecht & Sara Wagenknecht
Quincy: No commentary
Purdue Fort Wayne: Cody Lindeman, Farah Taki, & Megan Schlechte
Loyola Chicago: Scott Sudikoff & Lauren Withrow
Benedictine: Patrick Hennessey
Emmanuel: Patrick Hennessey
Hawai'i: Kanoa Leahey & Ryan Tsuji
Hawai'i: Kanoa Leahey & Ryan Tsuji
McKendree: Tyler Avenatti, Keegan Carey, & Natalie Stefanski
McKendree: Colin Suhre
Purdue Fort Wayne: Mike Maahs
Loyola Chicago: Patrick Hennessey & Tyler Avenatti 
Ohio State: Brendan Gulick & Zachary Rodier
Ball State: No commentary
Quincy: Cody Lindeman, Hannah Alvey, & Mikah Freppon
Lindenwood: No commentary
Ohio State: No commentary
Ball State: Joel Godett, Kevin Owens, & Madison Surface

References

2022 in sports in Illinois
2022 NCAA Division I & II men's volleyball season
2022 Midwestern Intercollegiate Volleyball Association season